Oxynoe azuropunctata is a species of small sea snail or sea slug, a bubble snail, a marine gastropod mollusk in the family Oxynoidae.

Distribution
Oxynoe azuropunctata is found in the Western Atlantic from the United States to Canada. The species was described from Florida Keys; the type locality for this species is Florida.

Description

Feeding habits
Food: Caulerpa paspaloides, Caulerpa cupressoides and Caulerpa sertularioides.

References

External links 
 http://www.seaslugforum.net/oxynazur.htm
 Bibliography of Oxynoe azuropunctata

Oxynoidae
Gastropods described in 1980